Big Spring International Park (also known as Big Spring Park) is located in downtown Huntsville, Alabama.  The park is built around its namesake "Big Spring", the original water source that the city of Huntsville was built around. The Huntsville Museum of Art and Von Braun Center are located in the park.  The park is also notable as the venue for the Panoply Arts Festival, held the last full weekend in April, Big Spring Jam, an annual music festival held on the fourth weekend in September from 1993 to 2011, and The Battle of the Buffalo, a buffalo wings competition held by the University of Alabama in Huntsville Alpha Tau Omega fraternity to support cancer research.

Big Spring Park is the expected trail head of the future Singing River Trail of North Alabama. A 70-mile bicycling and walking trail, it will connect Huntsville to Madison, Decatur, and Athens with an extended path along the Tennessee River.

The Big Spring

The Big Spring is a large, underground karst spring. Hearing of the abundant water source and plentiful big game, John Hunt, Huntsville's founder, sought out the spring and settled near it in 1805 on the bluff above, which later became the site of the First National Bank of Huntsville. Isaac and Joseph Criner had previously reached the Big Spring and considered settlement, but due to the presence of bears and mosquitoes left to settle New Market instead. During the 19th century and the first half of the 20th century, the spring was Huntsville's water source, due to its massive flow.

From 1827 to the early 1840s, what would later become the park grounds served as the site of the Fearn Canal, built from 1821 to 1824.  The canal was built by the Indian Creek Navigation Company, led by local resident Dr. Thomas Fearn.  It linked downtown Huntsville and the spring to the Tennessee River, allowing traders to bypass a costly wagon haul of about 11 miles South to the nearest river port, Ditto's Landing in the town of Whitesburg.  The canal eventually became obsolete upon the construction of railroads.

The Big Spring also served as the source of the city's water supply from settlement to the late 1960s when the Tennessee Valley Authority built the water treatment plant on the Tennessee River. The first pumphouse was built in the 1830s. It was enclosed in the 1850s. A water turbine pushed water up the bluffs through cedar pipes to reach the city's residents. Until 1840, the city waterwork's system was privately owned by the family of settler LeRoy Pope. His son sold the land to the city cheaply on the condition his heirs received their water for free and that the space around the Big Spring Basin would be open to the public. The first pumphouse was torn down in 1860 prior to the American Civil War and replaced by the second pumphouse made out of stone. New pumps were put in but little changed during the war. In 1890, the second pumphouse was extended with a new wing and smokestack to meet the new water needs as the city expanded and the new Monte Sano Hotel opened. This pumphouse was torn down by Col. Hiram M. Chittenden of the U.S. Army Corps of Engineers in 1899, and the waterworks system was moved further into the city. The third pumphouse would stand near California Street until the 1960s, when the water treatment plant would be built on the Tennessee River.

The Park

Big Spring Park is named for a spring named "the big spring" by the indigenous Cherokee and Chickasaw.  The original park site is situated in downtown Huntsville, starting from the west side of the courthouse square, and extending about two blocks southwest.  This part of the park includes the spring itself and a canal extending to the rest of the park. The park's construction began September 21, 1898, under the direction of Chittenden of the U.S. Army Corps of Engineers, stationed at the park during the Spanish–American War. Col. Chittenden became interested in the park and the source of the Big Spring. While exploring the source of the Big Spring, he discovered that horse waste from the courthouse square above was seeping into the city's water supply that the Big Spring produced. Col. Chittenden and his men tore down the pumphouse located at the basin of the Big Spring, put in a fountain, and lined the canal from 1898 to 1901. The park expanded across Church Street to the space which now has the park's lagoon in 1968.  In 2005, the park underwent additional expansion across Monroe Street to include a $284,000 fountain and a canal alongside the Von Braun Center.
 
Today the park prominently features gifts given by other countries and foreign nationals to the city of Huntsville, including a 1903 light beacon (often referred to as "the lighthouse") and a 1929 fog bell given by Norway in 1973.  Other smaller gifts include a bench from the United Kingdom and a sundial from Germany.

The most recognizable gifts, however, are the iconic red Japanese bridge and cherry trees, given by Japanese Major General Mikio Kimata. From 1964 to 1966, Kimata, then a Lieutenant Colonel, attended Redstone Arsenal's Ordnance Guided Missile School program.  As thanks to the city for its hospitality when hosting him, Kimata donated the original 60 Yoshino Cherry trees.  He followed up on this gift with the donation of a "friendship bridge" to celebrate the United States Bicentennial.  The bridge was formally dedicated on May 3, 1977.  In 1998, Kimata and the Japanese Society of Alabama partially financed a major $36,000 renovation of the bridge.  The bridge was restyled, expanded, and given a gentler slope.

A final gift, restored to its proper place in 1995, was the marble lion that sits near the Big Spring Fountain. The city was given the marble lion to commemorate the opening of the park. In the late 1960s, it had been pushed into the canal by vandals. It was salvaged and restored in 1995.

The park served as a major filming location in Constellation, a 2005 feature film.

Big Spring Park was one of the locations of a George Floyd protest that occurred on June 3, 2020, which was ended by Huntsville Police along with SWAT and Incident Response Team using tear gas, pepper spray, and rubber bullets.

See also
 Parks and Greenways in Huntsville

Notes

References

External links

Panoply Arts Festival official website 

Huntsville-Decatur, AL Combined Statistical Area
Parks in Alabama
Springs of Alabama
Geography of Huntsville, Alabama
Culture of Huntsville, Alabama
Protected areas of Madison County, Alabama
Tourist attractions in Huntsville, Alabama
Parks in Huntsville, Alabama
National Register of Historic Places in Huntsville, Alabama
Bodies of water of Madison County, Alabama
Parks on the National Register of Historic Places in Alabama